Lozno may refer to:

 Lozno, Kraljevo
 Lozno, Kyustendil Province, Bulgaria